Yasin Aydın (born 11 July 1995) is a Turkish male volleyball player. On club level he plays for Galatasaray.

National team career
He is part of the Turkey men's national volleyball team. He won the bronze medal with the Turkish team at the 2013 Islamic Solidarity Games.

References

External links
 profile at FIVB.org
 Player profile at Galatasaray.org

1995 births
Living people
Turkish men's volleyball players
Place of birth missing (living people)
Competitors at the 2018 Mediterranean Games
Galatasaray S.K. (men's volleyball) players
Mediterranean Games competitors for Turkey
21st-century Turkish people